Marne Creek is a stream in the U.S. state of South Dakota. It is a tributary of the Missouri River and flows through Yankton County. The Auld-Brokaw Multi-Use Trail follows the creek as it travels through the city of Yankton before joining the Missouri.

Marne Creek was named Rhine Creek until Anti-German sentiment during World War I caused the present name to be selected.

See also
List of rivers of South Dakota

References

Rivers of Yankton County, South Dakota
Rivers of South Dakota